Glen Thomas Powell Jr. (born October 21, 1988) is an American actor. He began his career with guest roles on television and small roles in films such as The Dark Knight Rises (2012) and The Expendables 3 (2014) before making his breakthrough performance as Chad Radwell in the Fox comedy-horror series Scream Queens (2015–2016). He has since starred as Finnegan in the coming-of-age comedy Everybody Wants Some!! (2016), astronaut John Glenn in the drama Hidden Figures (2016), and Charlie Young in Set It Up (2018), before achieving international recognition and acclaim as Lieutenant Jake "Hangman" Seresin in Top Gun: Maverick (2022). He went on to star as aviator Thomas Hudner in Devotion (2022).

Life and career
Powell was born in Austin, Texas. He is a graduate of Westwood High School in northwest Austin which is part of the Round Rock Independent School District. His acting career began while working with Antonio Banderas and Sylvester Stallone in Spy Kids 3-D: Game Over. In 2007, before his first year of college, Powell landed a role in The Great Debaters, directed by and starring Denzel Washington.

Since moving to Los Angeles, he has starred in television series such as Scream Queens, Into the West, Jack & Bobby, CSI: Miami, NCIS, Without a Trace, Rizzoli & Isles, and The Lying Game, along with the feature films like The Expendables 3, Ride Along 2, Sex Ed, Stuck in Love, The Dark Knight Rises, Hidden Figures, and Top Gun: Maverick.

He co-starred as Finnegan in Everybody Wants Some!!, Richard Linklater's spiritual sequel to Dazed & Confused, which was filmed in Austin and released by Paramount on March 30, 2016. He starred opposite Zoey Deutch in Set It Up, a romantic comedy on Netflix.

As of 2022, Powell is dating model Gigi Paris. He is a fan of the Texas Longhorns and Dallas Cowboys.

Filmography

Film

Television

References

External links
 

1988 births
21st-century American male actors
American male child actors
American male film actors
American male television actors
Living people
Male actors from Austin, Texas
Outstanding Performance by a Cast in a Motion Picture Screen Actors Guild Award winners
University of Texas at Austin alumni